David Aronberg (April 3, 1893 – February 11, 1967) was a mayor of Ashland, Kentucky. He was also a merchant, involved in the real estate business, and a soldier in the United States Army during World War I. Aronberg was a member of the Freemasons, Shriners, Kiwanis, Forty and Eight, Veterans of Foreign Wars, and Elks, as well as the American Legion, of which he was vice commander. Aronberg was also chairman of the National Civil Defense Committee.

Aronberg owned a chain of retail stores, being the senior partner of Aronberg and Pfeffer, along with David Pfeffer, from 1923 to 1956.

Aronberg was Jewish, and attended Congregation Agudath Achim in Ashland.

Notes and references

1893 births
1967 deaths
20th-century American businesspeople
American Freemasons
American people of English-Jewish descent
Businesspeople from Kentucky
British emigrants to the United States
Jewish mayors of places in the United States
Jews and Judaism in Appalachia
Mayors of Ashland, Kentucky
20th-century American politicians
Businesspeople from Manchester
Jewish American people in Kentucky politics
United States Army personnel of World War I
20th-century English businesspeople
20th-century American Jews